Saint Elizabeth Community Hospital is a 76-bed campus located in Red Bluff, California. The hospital is part of the Dignity Health network. It has a level-III trauma emergency department.

On November 14, 2017, several victims of the Rancho Tehama shootings were taken to Saint Elizabeth's emergency department for treatment.

Awards 
 Thomson Reuters 100 Top Hospital in the Nation for seven consecutive years.

References

External links 

 

Hospitals in California
Hospital networks in the United States

Trauma centers